Carmen de Areco is a partido of Buenos Aires Province in Argentina.

Settlements
Carmen de Areco
Gouin
Tres Sargentos
Kenny
Tatay

External links

 

Partidos of Buenos Aires Province
States and territories established in 1812